Castro is an Israeli clothing company specializing in men's and women's fashions. Publicly traded on the Tel Aviv Stock Exchange, the company is valued at 100 million US dollars. In 2013, it was Israel's largest fashion company.

The chain has 180 stores, with locations in Israel, Germany, Russia, Switzerland, Thailand, and Ukraine.

History

The company was founded by Aaron Castro, a Sephardic Jew from Thessaloniki, Greece, whose family immigrated to Israel when he was a young boy. His mother, Anina, was a professional dressmaker and designer who sewed for private clients.

In the 1950s, Castro opened a small corner store in Tel Aviv called Nina, named for his mother. As the business grew and the basement of the store became a small factory producing ready-to-wear clothing, the name was changed to Castro. In the 1960s, Castro clothing was also sold at department stores such as Hamashbir Letzarchan and Shekem. In 1965, Castro moved to direct marketing with "Rio", a factory outlet in Tel Aviv.

In 1975 Castro began exporting its clothing to Europe. Castro's flagship store opened on Dizengoff Street in 1985, and branches were established all over the country. By the 1990s, Castro had over 1544 workers. In 1992, Castro filed its IPO, going public. In 1994, Castro launched its cosmetics line by a licensing agreement. Castro has designed the Israeli team uniforms for the Olympics since 1996. Castro won Israel's fashion "Oscar."

In August 2000, Castro opened Castro Men. Also, 2003 saw the beginning of international expansion with stores in Germany. In 2005, Castro entered into a joint (50%) ownership of an international accessories chain, DIVA, with England-based DCK Concessions and today has 23 stores.

In 2007, Castro launched its Castro Jeans line.

Since 2008, Gal Gadot has been a leading model and fashion show host for Castro. In 2014, she appeared in a commercial for Castro's new "Push-Up" jeans, showing her and two backup dancers twerking in the jeans.

In 2013, Castro decided to expand its  women's and men's fashion collections, and added a children's line.

In 2014, Castro opened its online store. The items on the website are sold internationally.

Spokesmodels 
Romi Aboulafia
Rotem Sela
Yael Abecassis
Gal Gadot
Yael Goldman
Becky Griffin
Galit Gutmann
Bar Refaeli
Esti Ginzburg
Melanie Peres
Neta Alchimister
Dar Zuzovsky

See also
Israeli fashion
Hamashbir Lazarchan
Honigman
TNT
Fox
Adika

References

External links
 Castro.com

Clothing brands
Clothing companies of Israel
Clothing retailers of Israel
Israeli brands
Clothing companies established in 1973
Retail companies established in 1973
1973 establishments in Israel